St. Xavier's School is a private Catholic primary and secondary school located in Doranda, Ranchi, Jharkhand, India. The school was founded by the Jesuits in 1960 and named in honour of Saint Francis Xavier, co-founder of the Jesuits. It is run by the Society of Jesus and provides education from kindergarten to standard 12. Plus two (+2) was started in 2000 and was run under the guidance of the late Hira Prasad. The school is boys-only until standard 10 with its plus two section being co-educational.

Overview 
Until about 1976, the school followed the Cambridge Higher Secondary curriculum and now follows the Indian Certificate of Secondary Education (ICSE) curriculum. The school feeds students into the engineering colleges (IITs and BIT, NITs, KIIT, etc.) and medical colleges of India. It is now one of the most renowned schools in the east zone and is famous for its achievements in fields such as sports, debate, academics, quizzes and many more.

The motto of the school was coined in Sanskrit by Fr. C. Bulcke, when Courage to Excel by All was considered a contribution towards the building up of one country and one nation.

History 
This school was started in 1960 in response to a request from the professional community of Heavy Engineering Corporation, Hindustan Steel Ltd., and the National Coal Development Corporation.

Alumni 
Students and alumni of the school are referred to as Xaverians or Doranda Old Xaverians. The Doranda Old Xaverians are mainly networked through their alumni portal www.dorandaoldxaverians.com and Facebook and WhatsApp groups.  DOX has active chapters in Bengaluru, New Delhi NCR and Mumbai and an upcoming chapter in Kolkata. The Doranda Old Xaverians Association (DOX), formerly Xavier's Old Boys Association Jharkhand, is the official alumni association of St. Xavier's School, Ranchi. The association presently has over 13,000 members, spanning across all batches that have passed out of the school since 1964. 

St Xavier's Doranda is a part of the Jesuit Alumni Association of India. DOX was awarded the Best Alumni Association in 3 different categories at the JAAI Congress in 2020. It was judged as #1 in 'Landmark Legacy,' 'Supporting Spirit' and 'Evolving Education' and runners up in 'Glory to Alma Mater.'

Notable alumni 

 Shiney Ahuja, Indian actor
 Sajal Chakraborty, I.A.S (1980 batch), former Chief Secretary of the State of Jharkhand
 Abhishek Chaubey (1993 batch), Indian film director, writer, screenwriter and producer
 Birender Singh Dhanoa, (1969-1971), Air Chief Marshal
 Jairam Ramesh (1961-1963 class 3 to 5), former Indian Minister of State (Independent Charge) for Environment and Forests
 Lt. Gen. Amrik Singh, AVSM, Chief of Army Staff Commendation, General Officer Commanding in Chief Commendation, Sena Medal (distinguished)

See also

 Education in India
 List of schools in India
 Central Board of Secondary Education
 List of Jesuit schools

References

External links 
 
 

Jesuit secondary schools in India
Boys' schools in India
Jesuit primary schools in India
Primary schools in India
High schools and secondary schools in Jharkhand
Christian schools in Jharkhand
Private schools in Jharkhand
Schools in Ranchi
Educational institutions established in 1960
1960 establishments in Bihar